Balabhadrapatruni Ramani is an Indian litterateur, novelist, playwright, screenwriter, dialogue writer, and film critic, known for her works in Telugu theatre, Telugu cinema, Television, and Radio. She has served as Jury Member for Southern Region II at the 66th National Film Awards.

Early life and education
Ramani Balabhadrapatruni was born Ramani Ankaraju on 26 January 1964 in Hyderabad, India to Ankaraju Anand Bhushan Rao and Ankaraju Sathyavathi Devi. She got her Bachelor of Arts degree in 1985 from Kasturba Gandhi College in Secunderabad.

Novelist

 Leader 
 Mogude Rendo Priyudu
 Swargam Lo Khaidelu
 Repalle Lo Radha
 Aa Okkati Adigesey
 Evare Athagadu
 Preminchaka Emaindante
 Neeku naku madhya 
 Alinganam
 Aunante Kaadanta
 Neeku Naaku Madhya
 Andari Bandhuvaya
 Khajuraho
 Edee Ninnati Swapnam

Selected filmography

As Screenwriter and dialogue writer 

 Anaganaga O Ammayi (1999)
 Repalle Lo Radha (2001)
 Evare Athagadu (2003)
 Boss (2006)
 Madhumasam (2007)
 Rainbow (2008)
 Oh My God (2008)
 Andari Bandhuvaya (2010)
 Pattudhala (2013)
Mrs. Subbalakshmi (2019)

Television, theatre and radio

Awards and honors

References

Telugu writers
1964 births
Living people
Telugu women writers
Writers from Hyderabad, India
Women writers from Andhra Pradesh
Screenwriters from Hyderabad, India
20th-century Indian dramatists and playwrights
20th-century Indian women writers
21st-century Indian women writers
Indian women screenwriters
Indian film critics
Novelists from Andhra Pradesh
Indian experimental filmmakers
21st-century Indian dramatists and playwrights
Indian communists